Fadi Kouzmah (born May 13, 1983) is a Syrian former swimmer, who specialized in butterfly events. Kouzmah qualified only for the men's 200 m butterfly at the 2000 Summer Olympics in Sydney by receiving a Universality place from FINA, without meeting an entry time. He challenged five other swimmers in heat one, including Ecuador's two-time Olympian Roberto Delgado. He rounded out the field to last place with a slowest time of 2:11.56. Kouzmah failed to advance into the semifinals, as he placed forty-sixth overall in the prelims.

References

1983 births
Living people
Syrian male swimmers
Olympic swimmers of Syria
Swimmers at the 2000 Summer Olympics
Male butterfly swimmers
Swimmers at the 1998 Asian Games
Asian Games competitors for Syria
21st-century Syrian people